Willow Grove may refer to:
 Willow Grove (Greensboro, Maryland), listed on the NRHP in Maryland
 Willow Grove, Delaware, United States
 Willow Grove (in Pittsgrove Twp), New Jersey, United States
 Willow Grove, Pennsylvania, United States
 Willow Grove (Madison Mills, Virginia), listed on the NRHP in Virginia
 Willow Grove, New Brunswick, Canada
 Willow Grove Park, Pennsylvania
 Willow Grove Park Mall, a shopping mall in Willow Grove, Pennsylvania
Willow Grove, West Virginia
 Willow Grove, Victoria, Australia
 Willow Grove (SEPTA station), station on the SEPTA Warminster Line
 Willow Grove Cemetery, New Brunswick, New Jersey, United States
 Naval Air Station Joint Reserve Base Willow Grove, Pennsylvania
 Camp Willow Grove, a US Army camp in northwestern Arizona from 1866 to 1869